Calamotropha mesostrigalis is a moth in the family Crambidae. It was described by George Hampson in 1919. It is found in Mozambique.

References

Endemic fauna of Mozambique
Crambinae
Moths described in 1919
Moths of Sub-Saharan Africa
Lepidoptera of Mozambique